Tasman Lake is a proglacial lake formed by the recent retreat of the Tasman Glacier in New Zealand's South Island.

In the early 1970s, there were several small meltwater ponds on the Tasman Glacier. By 1990, these ponds had merged into Tasman Lake.

Tasman Lake has quickened the retreat of the Tasman Glacier. Initially it did so by undercutting the cliff at the end of the glacier, causing parts of the cliff to fall into the lake. Since 2006, however, a  apron of submerged glacial ice projects out from the cliff, and icebergs periodically break off the apron and float away down the lake. Because more of the glacier is now in contact with the water, its rate of retreat has increased. It is expected to grow to a maximum length of about  within the next one or two decades.

Tasman Lake, the glacier and the surrounding mountains are part of Aoraki / Mount Cook National Park. Taking a boat tour among the icebergs on the Tasman Lake is now a popular tourist activity. Tasman Lake can be reached by road from the nearby Mount Cook Village and a short walk from the car park at the end of the road.

Like many other geographic places in both New Zealand and Australia, it is named after Dutch explorer Abel Janszoon Tasman.

See also
Climate change in New Zealand

References

External links 

 New Zealand Department of Conservation - Aoraki / Mount Cook National Park

Lakes of Canterbury, New Zealand
Proglacial lakes